Mila Haugová (born 14 June 1942) is a Slovak poet.

Life
Haugová was born in Budapest on 14 June 1942, but she moved around with her family as a child living in Vráble, Nitra, Breziny, Zlaté Moravce and Levice. Between 1951 and 1952 her father was a political prisoner and Haugova inherited his politics. She worked as an agronomist after attending college in Nitra, before becoming a secondary school teacher.

She went to Canada following the invading tanks sent into Czechoslovakia in 1968 by the Warsaw Pact. She returned the following year. She published her early poetry book called Rusty Clay (Hrdzavá hlina) in 1980 under the name Mila Srnková. In 1986 she started a decade long stint as editor of the literary magazine Romboid. After this she earned her living translating from German and writing and living in Bratislava and Levice. in 1990 she published Čisté dni which was based on, Peter Ondreička, her partners graphical works. Ondreička who was a painter died in the same year. She published Atlas piesku and Genotext in 2011.

References

1942 births
Living people
Writers from Budapest
Slovak poets
20th-century Slovak women writers
20th-century Slovak writers
International Writing Program alumni
20th-century poets
Slovak women poets